The 2013–14 Grand Prix of Figure Skating Final was an international figure skating competition in the 2013–14 season, held together with the ISU Junior Grand Prix Final. The combined event was the culmination of two international series — the Grand Prix of Figure Skating and the Junior Grand Prix.

The competition was held in Fukuoka, Japan from 5 to 8 December 2013, with medals awarded in the disciplines of men's singles, ladies' singles, pair skating, and ice dancing on the senior and junior levels.

Medalists

Senior

Junior

Medals table

Overall

Senior

Junior

Qualifiers

Senior-level qualifiers
Skaters who reached the age of 14 by 1 July 2013 were eligible to compete at two senior 2013–14 Grand Prix events – including the 2013 Skate America, 2013 Skate Canada International, 2013 Cup of China, 2013 NHK Trophy, 2013 Trophée Éric Bompard, and 2013 Rostelecom Cup – where they earned points according to their results. The six highest ranking skaters in each discipline qualified for the senior Grand Prix Final.

Changes to initial lineup: Daisuke Takahashi withdrew due to a leg injury. He was replaced by countryman Nobunari Oda.

Junior-level qualifiers
Skaters who reached the age of 13 by 1 July 2013 but had not turned 19 (singles and females of the other two disciplines) or 21 (male pair skaters and ice dancers) were eligible to compete at two 2013–14 ISU Junior Grand Prix events, earning points according to their results. The six highest-ranking skaters in each discipline qualified for the JGP Final.

Changes to initial lineup: Karen Chen withdrew due to an ankle injury and was replaced by fellow American Angela Wang.

Senior-level results

Men
Yuzuru Hanyu set a new world record for the short program (99.84).

Ladies

Pairs

Ice dancing

Junior-level results

Junior men

Junior ladies

Junior pairs

Junior ice dancing

References

External links

 Entries at the International Skating Union
 Starting order and Result details
 Senior Grand Prix standings: Men, Ladies, Pairs, Ice dancing
 Junior Grand Prix standings: Men, Ladies, Pairs, Ice dancing

2013 in Japanese sport
2013 in figure skating
Grand Prix of Figure Skating Final
ISU Junior Grand Prix
Figure skating in Japan
2013 in youth sport
2014 in youth sport